Déjà Vu is a 1990 Soviet-Polish comedy thriller that takes place in Soviet Odesa in 1925 and spoofs a variety of gangster films.

Plot 
The plot takes place in 1925. One of Chicago mobsters Mik Nich (born as Mikita Nichiporuk) flees to Soviet Odesa to escape the revenge of other mobsters. Mob leaders send the best hit-man Johnny Polak to Odesa. The killer disguises himself as an American entomology professor who wants to visit the grave of his father in Odesa.

In search of his victim, Polak gets into the most unbelievable situations arising from the peculiarities of the city of Odesa, as well as from mad historical era. Being the first passenger of the ship voyage New York City-Odesa, he is assigned to be accompanied by the Komsomol guide Glushko and is besieged by pioneers and journalists. Jumping from the train and hitting his head, Polak forgets what he is actually doing there (retrograde amnesia) and tries to live up to his cover as an honest professor. Nichiporuk, in turn, learns about the arrival of the killer and is trying to kill him. Polak experiences several periods of regain and loss of memory (a periodical Déjà vu) while trying to track down Nichiporuk. Finally, Nichiporuk is arrested by Soviet authorities on an unrelated charge and sent to jail. Polak, having lost the rest of his sanity, ends up in a mental hospital.

Cultural references
At one point, as Polak chases Nichiporuk through the city, both accidentally take part in the filming of the famous Odesa Steps sequence from Battleship Potemkin.

Cast
Jerzy Stuhr as Johnny Polak
Galina Petrova as Klara Glushko
Nikolai Karachentsov as Mishka Yaponchik (Mike the Little Jap)
Vladimir Golovin as Mick Nich (Michail Nichiporuk)
Liza Machulska 	 		
Viktor Stepanov			
Oleg Shklovsky as George (Sr. Lt. Perepletchikov)
Vasili Mishchenko as Kostya
Vladimir Belousov 			
Vsevolod Safonov			
Gennadi Vengerov as Sanitar Petrovich
Vitali Shapovalov 	 		
Wojciech Wysocki 			
Armen Khostikyan 			
Murad Janibekyan

See also 
Red Heat

References

External links 
 

1990 films
1990s comedy thriller films
Soviet comedy thriller films
Russian comedy thriller films
1990s Russian-language films
Films directed by Juliusz Machulski
Films set in 1925
Films set in Odesa
Films set in the Soviet Union
Films shot in Odesa
Polish comedy thriller films
Foreign films set in the United States